Sound Affects is the fifth studio album by English rock band The Jam. The album was released on 28 November 1980 by Polydor Records. It is the only Jam album to be co-produced by the band themselves, and contains the only album track co-written by the entire band, "Music for the Last Couple".

The cover art is a pastiche of the artwork used on various Sound Effects records produced by the BBC during the 1970s.

Jam frontman Paul Weller has opined Sound Affects to be the Jam's best album.

Influences
Noted musical influences on Sound Affects include post-punk groups such as Wire, Gang of Four, and Joy Division and, particularly evident in Rick Buckler's drumming, Michael Jackson's Off the Wall. Paul Weller has freely admitted that the Beatles' Revolver was a major influence on much of the material on Sound Affects. At the time of its release, he said that he considered the album a cross between Off the Wall and Revolver.

"Start!" is built around an almost exact copy of the bassline from the Beatles' "Taxman", the first track on Revolver, and includes a homage to its guitar solo. "Pretty Green" includes a funk bassline and rhythm with melodic guitar breaks and psychedelic sound effects. "That's Entertainment" is an acoustic ballad. "Boy About Town" and "Dream Time" include horns. Instrumental track “Music For The Last Couple” has similarities to the sound of David Bowie’s Low album.

The back cover of the album features an excerpt from Percy Bysshe Shelley's poem The Masque of Anarchy.

Release
Sound Affects sold over 100,000 copies and spent 19 weeks on the UK Albums Chart, rising to number two in late 1980. In the United States, the album spent 11 weeks on the Billboard 200 chart and reached its peak position of number 72 in February 1981.

The album features the group's second UK number one single, "Start!". Polydor pushed for "Pretty Green" to be the first single released, but Weller insisted on "Start!". This involved consulting a few of the band's friends as to what they thought the best release would be. Weller had Polydor A&R man Dennis Munday ask a small peer group of his friends who had been present throughout the recording sessions at the Town House and prior demo recordings at Polydor Studios. Given the choice, they selected "Start!" as the best single release and the decision was made to release it. The decision was vindicated when "Start!" topped the British singles charts in its third week after entering at number three.

Sound Affects was reissued on 8 November 2010 as a two-CD deluxe edition to celebrate its 30th anniversary. The 2010 reissue also charted in the UK, reaching number 63 in November of that year.

Reception

Record Mirror ranked it the best album of 1980.

In 2006, Q placed Sound Affects at number 15 on its list of the "40 Best Albums of the '80s". In 2013, NME ranked Sound Affects at number 487 on its list of the 500 greatest albums of all time. In 2020, Rolling Stone included Sound Affects in their "80 Greatest albums of 1980" list, praising the band for crafting their "finest album", while encapsulating "the classic English songcraft of the Kinks and the Small Faces, singing about working-class anger". The album was also included in the book 1001 Albums You Must Hear Before You Die.

In BBC Radio 6 Music's documentary The Jam: Made in Britain, Paul Weller cited Sound Affects as his favourite Jam album.

Track listing

Deluxe Track listing
CD1 as per original release

Track listing CD2
 Start! (Single Version) - 2:20
 Liza Radley - 2:34
 Dreams Of Children - 2:59
 That's Entertainment (Alternative) - 3:24
 Pretty Green (Demo) - 2:38
 Pop Art Poem - 2:10
 Rain (Demo) written by John Lennon & Paul McCartney - 2:58
 Boy About Town (Demo) - 2:18
 Dream Time (Demo) - 1:52
 Dead End Street (Demo) written by Ray Davies - 3:15
 But I'm Different Now (Demo) - 1:57
 Scrape Away (Instrumental) - 3:59
 Start! (Demo) - 2:17
 Liza Radley (Demo) - 2:18
 And Your Bird Can Sing (Demo) written by John Lennon & Paul McCartney - 1:54
 Monday (Alternative) - 4:20
 Get Yourself Together (Demo) written by Ronnie Lane & Steve Marriott - 2:00
 Set the House Ablaze (Alternative) - 4:47
 Boy About Town (Alternative) - 2:14
 No One In The World (Demo) - 2:24
 'Instrumental' (Demo) - 2:54
 Waterloo Sunset (Demo) written by Ray Davies - 3:59 

"Start!" was the first track on side one of the US issue. This issue also included the "Going Underground" / "Dreams of Children" 7".
On the Canadian issue (Polydor PD-1-6315), "Start!" and "Pretty Green" were switched.
 Pop Art Poem was first released on flexidisc free with Flexipop magazine

Personnel
Credits are adapted from the album's liner notes and AllMusic.

The Jam
Paul Weller – guitar, vocals, keyboards, sitar
Bruce Foxton – bass guitar, vocals
Rick Buckler – drums, percussion

Technical
The Jam – production, sleeve design
Vic Coppersmith-Heaven – production
George Chambers – assistant engineering
Alan Douglas – engineering
Bill Smith – sleeve design
Andrew Douglas – photography
Martyn Goddard – photography
Andrew Rosen – photography
Pennie Smith – photography

Charts

Weekly charts

Year-end charts

Certifications

References

External links

1980 albums
Polydor Records albums
The Jam albums
Post-punk albums by British artists